Harold Vincent Burns (20 May 1908 – 4 June 1944) was an Australian first-class cricketer who played for the Queensland cricket team from 1930/31 until 1931/32. He is the great-uncle of Joe Burns, who plays cricket for the Queensland cricket team and the Australia national cricket team.

References

External links
 

1908 births
1944 deaths
Queensland cricketers
Australian cricketers
Sportspeople from Cairns
Wicket-keepers